The Great Wall of Lucy Wu is the 2011 debut novel of Wendy Wan-Long Shang. It was first published in January 2011 through Scholastic Inc. The work focuses on the concept of a young girl starting the sixth grade and dealing with the troubles that come with growing up but also with having a split cultural identity. The book is considered suitable for readers ages 8–12.

Plot
The Great Wall of Lucy Wu is Wendy Wan-Long Shang's first novel.

Reception
Critical reception has been positive, and Smithsonian Asian Pacific American Center stated that "Shang’s debut novel is a well-blended cornucopia of the multicultural tween’s challenges." The Los Angeles Times wrote a favorable review for the book, which they felt would appeal to "young readers struggling with issues of self-identity, whatever their heritage." The Bulletin of the Center for Children's Books also praised the book and commented that "Bits of Chinese history and culture as well as allusions to incidents of prejudice and racism are effectively integrated without melodrama, leaving the focus entirely on Lucy’s preteen and familial experience. Her struggle to determine what and who is important to her will most certainly resonate with young readers."

Summary
Lucy Wu, soon to be W.N.B.A. player and Interior Designer of sporty girls accessories and home decor is an almost 6th grader about to have her own room. She thinks her life is almost perfect: She's finally going to be a sixth grader, her sister, Regina is going to college meaning she'll have her own room, and to top it all off she's going out for captain on her basketball team. While she's thinking she's going to have all of her perfect dreams come true, one of them gets crushed. Her grandmother's sister, Yi Po is coming to live at her house, and guess where she's staying!? Yup, you guessed it! Yi Po is gonna be staying with Lucy, in her room, that was supposed to be all hers. Now she'll have to share it AGAIN!

Selected awards and recognition
 2012 NCTE/CLA Notable Children's Books in the English Language Arts
 2012 Children's Literature Award, Asian-Pacific American Librarians Association

References

External links

 

2013 American novels
American children's novels
Chinese-American novels
Basketball books
2013 children's books
Literature by Chinese-American women
2013 debut novels
Chinese New Year children's books
Novels set in elementary and primary schools
Scholastic Corporation books